Stasin may refer to the following places:
Stasin, Kuyavian-Pomeranian Voivodeship (north-central Poland)
Stasin, Gmina Konopnica in Lublin Voivodeship (east Poland)
Stasin, Gmina Wojciechów in Lublin Voivodeship (east Poland)
Stasin, Gmina Chodel in Lublin Voivodeship (east Poland)
Stasin, Gmina Józefów nad Wisłą in Lublin Voivodeship (east Poland)
Stasin, Siedlce County in Masovian Voivodeship (east-central Poland)
Stasin, Sokołów County in Masovian Voivodeship (east-central Poland)
Stasin, Wyszków County in Masovian Voivodeship (east-central Poland)
Stasin, Greater Poland Voivodeship (west-central Poland)